Susan Marie "Susie" Kelley (born November 1, 1954 in Needham, Massachusetts) is an American ice dancer. With partner Andrew Stroukoff, she represented the United States at the 1976 Winter Olympics, where they placed 17th. They represented the Skating Club of Boston

Following her retirement from skating, she became a coach. Among her current and former students are Cathy Reed & Chris Reed and Maia Shibutani & Alex Shibutani.

Competitive highlights
(with Stroukoff)

References

 Sports-reference profile

American female ice dancers
Olympic figure skaters of the United States
Figure skaters at the 1976 Winter Olympics
1954 births
Living people
Sportspeople from Needham, Massachusetts
21st-century American women